Since acceding to the throne of Sweden in 1973, Carl XVI Gustaf has received a number of state and official visits. He usually hosts one or two visiting heads of state each year.

Visits

References

Foreign relations of Sweden
Carl Xvi Gustaf, State Visits Received
Carl Xvi Gustaf
Carl Xvi Gustaf
State visits received by Carl XVI Gustaf
Carl XVI Gustaf